Alder Point is a community in the Canadian province of Nova Scotia, located in the Cape Breton Regional Municipality.   It derives its name from the nearby headland of the same name, Alder Point.

Demographics 

References

 Alder Point on Destination Nova Scotia

Communities in the Cape Breton Regional Municipality
Designated places in Nova Scotia
Mining communities in Nova Scotia